Sandrew Metronome is a Scandinavian film distribution company formed in the 1990s. It was one of the biggest distributor companies in the Nordic countries. Sandrew Metronome was established by the Swedish company Sandrews and the Danish Metronome. Later the Norwegian media company Schibsted acquired Metronome and became joint owner with Sandrews. Schibsted gained sole owner in 2006, but later divested its holdings of Sandrew Metronome to a group of investors and its former CEO in 2013.

Between 2005 and 2007 Sandrew Metronome sold its cinemas. In 2011 the company ceased its theatrical distribution operations leaving it with only the DVD distribution.

Sandrew Metronome was for decades one of the leading Scandinavian majors. Historically, revenue was generated from the exploitation of its content through traditional distribution platforms, including theatrical distribution, home entertainment and television. Sandrew Metronome also owned movie theatres in Sweden, Denmark and Finland with no. 2 positions in the Nordics.

For several years, Sandrew Metronome was the Nordic distributor for films by Warner Bros. and had also acquired the Nordic rights for the movies from Focus Features, Miramax, Pathé, Lionsgate.

The business has since then been repositioned to having a sharp focus on exploitation of and investment in entertainment content for digital distribution platforms.

Sandrew Metronome holds a broad collection of valuable intellectual property and commercially successful and critically acclaimed entertainment content, such as movies, TV series and music catalogue rights. In the movie catalogue are among others the high quality and award-winning movies titles: Der Untergang, The Queen, Lost In Translation, The Phantom Of The Opera, and Volver.

External links
Sandrew Metronome to shut down Swedish theatrical distribution, Screendaily.com 10 March, 2011
Schibsted säljer Sandrew Metronome (Schibsted sells Sandrew Metronome), Schibsted.no 17 April 2013
Official homepage

Film distributors
Film production companies of Sweden
Film production companies of Denmark
Film production companies of Norway